The 2016 League of Ireland Cup, known for sponsorship reasons as the 2016 EA Sports Cup, was the 43rd season of the League of Ireland's secondary knockout competition. The EA Sports Cup features teams from the SSE Airtricity League Premier and First Divisions, as well as some intermediate level teams.

Teams

Clubs denoted with * received a bye into Second Round

First round
The draw for the First Round took place on 17 February 2016.
 The First Round games were played on 21, 22 and 28 March 2016.

Second round
The draw for the Second Round took place on 23 March 2016. The games were played on 18 and 19 April 2016.

Quarter finals

Semi finals

Final

Top scorers

References

External links
 EA Sports Cup Fixtures and Results

Cup
3
League of Ireland Cup seasons